Rudbar Rural District is a rural district (dehestan) in the Central District of Tafresh County, Markazi Province, Iran. At the 2006 census, its population was 3,656, in 1,133 families. The rural district has 27 villages.

References 

Rural Districts of Markazi Province
Tafresh County